Saint Issel or Issell ( or Usyllt) was a 6th-century Welsh saint from Dyfed principally notable as being the father of Saint Teilo.

His name appears in many forms in surviving texts, but seems to have been derived from the Latin name Auxilius.

The Book of Llandaff gives his wife as Guenhaf daughter of Liuonui. He was the father of Saint Teilo and the Anauved who married King Budig of Armorica and bore three saints. The oldest genealogies present him as also the father of Saint Cynllo.

He was the patron saint of the parish church at Saundersfoot but probably not the patron of Haroldston St Issells which was probably corrupted from an original dedication to his grandson Saint Ismael.

References

6th-century Christian saints
Medieval Welsh saints
History of Pembrokeshire
People from Pembrokeshire